The 2018–19 CAF Confederation Cup group stage were played from 3 February to 17 March 2019. A total of 16 teams competed in the group stage to decide the eight places in the knockout stage of the 2018–19 CAF Confederation Cup.

Draw
The draw for the group stage was held on 21 January 2019, 12:00 CAT (UTC+2), at the CAF headquarters in Cairo, Egypt. The 16 teams, including the winners of the first round with the best CAF 5-Year Ranking, Étoile du Sahel, and the 15 winners of the play-off round of qualifying, were drawn into four groups of four.

The teams were seeded by their performances in the CAF competitions for the previous five seasons (CAF 5-Year Ranking points shown in parentheses). Each group contained one team from each of Pot 1 and Pot 2, and two teams from Pot 3, and each team was drawn into one of the positions in their group.

Format
In the group stage, each group was played on a home-and-away round-robin basis. The winners and runners-up of each group advanced to the quarter-finals of the knockout stage.

Tiebreakers
The teams were ranked according to points (3 points for a win, 1 point for a draw, 0 points for a loss). If tied on points, tiebreakers were applied in the following order (Regulations III. 20 & 21):
Points in head-to-head matches among tied teams;
Goal difference in head-to-head matches among tied teams;
Goals scored in head-to-head matches among tied teams;
Away goals scored in head-to-head matches among tied teams;
If more than two teams are tied, and after applying all head-to-head criteria above, a subset of teams are still tied, all head-to-head criteria above are reapplied exclusively to this subset of teams;
Goal difference in all group matches;
Goals scored in all group matches;
Away goals scored in all group matches;
Drawing of lots.

Schedule
The schedule of each matchday was as follows (matches scheduled in midweek in italics). Effective from the Confederation Cup group stage, weekend matches were played on Sundays while midweek matches were played on Wednesdays, with some exceptions. Kick-off times were also fixed at 13:00, 16:00 and 19:00 GMT.

Groups

Group A

Group B

Group C

Group D

References

External links
Total Confederation Cup 2018/2019, CAFonline.com

2
February 2019 sports events in Africa
March 2019 sports events in Africa